Régis Guyot (born 1949) is a French civil servant (prefect).

Régis Guyot was born on 12 March 1949 in Versailles, Yvelines, Île-de-France.

He is a graduate of Institut d’études politiques de Paris (IEP Paris).

Career 
 Sub-prefect of arrondissement of Vire (1978) in Vire City
 Sub-prefect of arrondissement of Oloron-Sainte-Marie (1980) in Oloron-Sainte-Marie City
 Sub-prefect of arrondissement of Forbach (1990) in Forbach City
 Prefect of Deux-Sèvres from 2006 to 2009, in Niort City
 Prefect of Ain from 2009 to 2010, in Bourg-en-Bresse City

Honours and awards
 :
 Chevalier (Knight) of Légion d’honneur

Sources, Notes, References
  "Guyot, Régis, Marie, Denis" (prefect, born 1949), page 1069 in Who's Who in France : Dictionnaire biographique de personnalités françaises vivant en France et à l’étranger, et de personnalités étrangères résidant en France, 44th edition for 2013 edited in 2012, 2371 p., 31 cm,  .
  http://www.whoswho.fr/bio/regis-guyot_22223 :  Who's Who in France on line (access restricted : fee).
  Jean Orselli, Usages et usagers de la route : requiem pour un million de morts, Éditions L’Harmattan, 2012, 600 p., p. 491.
  Gilles Gaetner, La république des copains, p. 261, éd. Flammarion, 2005, 
  Claude Got, La violence routière : des mensonges qui tuent, Éditions Tec&Doc Lavoisier, 2008, 162 p., p. 93-94.
  Alain Larcan et Henri Julien, Le secourisme en France : panorama et perspectives, Éditions Lavoisier, 2011, 138 p., p. 106-108.

1949 births
People from Versailles
Living people
Sciences Po alumni
Prefects of Deux-Sèvres
Prefects of Ain
Chevaliers of the Légion d'honneur